Publius Licinius Crassus Dives was the name of several Roman politicians:
 Publius Licinius Crassus Dives (consul 205 BC)
 Publius Licinius Crassus Dives Mucianus (180 BC – 130 BC)